Claude Renoir (December 4, 1913 – September 5, 1993) was a French cinematographer. He was the son of actor Pierre Renoir, the grandson of painter Pierre-Auguste Renoir, and the nephew of director Jean Renoir.

He was born in Paris, his mother being actress Véra Sergine. He was apprenticed to Boris Kaufman, a brother of Dziga Vertov, who much later worked in the United States on such films as On the Waterfront (1954). Renoir was the lighting cameraman on numerous pictures such as Monsieur Vincent (1947), Jean Renoir's The River (1951), Cleopatra (1963),  Roger Vadim's Barbarella (1968), French Connection II (1975), and the James Bond film The Spy Who Loved Me (1977). At the time of Claude Renoir's death, The Times of London wrote of The River that "its exquisite evocation of the Indian scene, helped to inaugurate a new era in the cinema, one in which color was finally accepted as a medium fit for great film makers to work in."

He also participated in the making of The Mystery of Picasso (1956), the documentary on painter Pablo Picasso directed by Henri-Georges Clouzot. He was the cinematographer for The Crucible (1957) and lived in East Germany during filming. Renoir's career came to a close in the late 1970s, as he was rapidly losing his sight. In his final years he was largely blind.

He married twice and had two children, a son and a daughter, actress Sophie Renoir. Claude Renoir died at age 79 in Troyes, 55 miles east of Paris, near the village of Essoyes, where he had a home.

Selected filmography

References

External links

1913 births
1993 deaths
French cinematographers
Claude